The 1969 Florida Gators football team represented the University of Florida during the 1969 NCAA University Division football season. The season was the tenth, last, and arguably most successful season for Ray Graves as the head coach of the Florida Gators football team.  Graves' 1969 Florida Gators finished their regular season with an overall record of 8–1–1 and an SEC record of 3–1–1, placing fourth among the ten SEC teams. Florida concluded the year with a Gator Bowl victory over SEC-champion Tennessee. Afterwards, Graves resigned from the head coaching position to become the university's athletic director, and was replaced by Tennessee head coach Doug Dickey.

Graves' final Gators squad was led by a surprising group of second-year offensive players known as the "Super Sophs", that included quarterback John Reaves, wide receiver Carlos Alvarez and tailback Tommy Durrance.

Before the season
The team was captained by Mac Steen.

Schedule

Primary source: 2016 Florida Gators Football Media Guide

Attendance figures: 1970 University of Florida Brochure.

Roster

Season summary

Houston
In the opening game against the seventh-ranked Houston Cougars, the unranked Gators debuted a new passing offense which set the tone of success for the rest of the season  and upset the Cougars 59–34. Carlos Alvarez  had 6 catches and 182 yards receiving.

Mississippi State
In the second week of play, the Gators beat Mississippi State. 47–25. Alvarez  had 12 catches and 180 yards receiving.

Florida State

The Gators won the matchup over Florida State 21–6 on the back of a defensive surge that was unparalleled in Gator history.  The Gators defense, led by junior defensive lineman Jack Youngblood,  and sophomore defensive lineman Robert Harrell, sacked FSU quarterback Bill Cappleman eleven times for 91 yards leaving FSU with a total of negative 18 yards rushing in the game. Youngblood had been shifted to defensive end, with Harrell at tackle.  Harrell earned National Defensive Lineman of The Week honors.

In addition to the pass rush, the FSU offense fumbled the ball eight times, losing five. Two other Gator Sophomores starred in the game as well, All-American wide out Carlos Alvarez and quarterback John Reaves. Alvarez had seven catches for 134 yards.

Tulane
On "Super Saturday" in Tampa, the Gators came from behind and went for two to beat winless Tulane by an 18–17 score. Alvarez had 11 catches for 146 yards. "It was a damn poor victory, but it tasted a lost better than a defeat would have" wrote Jack Hairston.

North Carolina
The Gators defeated the North Carolina Tar Heels 52–2 and Alvarez caught 4 passes for 122 yards.

Vanderbilt
Florida won over the Vanderbilt Commodores 41–20. Reaves threw 5 touchdowns and Alvarez  had 11 catches for 112 yards.

Auburn; Georgia
A Southeastern Conference (SEC) loss to the Auburn Tigers and a tie with the rival Georgia Bulldogs cost the Gators a share of their elusive first SEC football championship.

Kentucky
In a 31–6 victory over the Kentucky Wildcats 31–6. Alvarez had 10 catches for 105 receiving yards.

Miami
Florida beat the Miami Hurricanes 35–16 as Carlos Alvarez had a then-record 237 receiving yards on 15 receptions.

Postseason

Tennessee

In a strange twist, the Gators were invited to play coach Doug Dickey's SEC champion Tennessee Volunteers in the December 1969 Gator Bowl.  In a game dominated by a Gators defense led by linebacker Mike Kelley (the game's MVP), defensive back Steve Tannen and defensive end Jack Youngblood, the Gators upset the Volunteers 14–13 to cap their 9–1–1 season—the Gators' best ever single-season record to that time.  After the Gator Bowl, Ray Graves resigned as the head coach of the Gators football team, but continued as the athletic director of the Florida Gators sports program until 1979.

During the 1960s, Graves compiled an overall record of 70–31–4 (.686) during the decade, making Graves the winningest coach in the history of the Gators football program until that time.

References

Florida
Florida Gators football seasons
Gator Bowl champion seasons
Florida Gators football